Nicholas J. Calogero (August 27, 1924 – October 9, 2004) was an American politician who served in the New York State Assembly from the 116th district from 1973 to 1980.

References

1924 births
2004 deaths
Republican Party members of the New York State Assembly
20th-century American politicians